The Cooksville Cheese Factory in Evansville is a remnant of Wisconsin's early dairy industry. It was added to the National Register of Historic Places in 1980.

In 1875 Benjamin Hoxie started a business in Cooksville to buy milk from local farmers and make cheese. The enterprise was an agricultural cooperative, with the patrons (farmers) sharing ownership and Hoxie the proprietor of the factory. It could process the milk of 600 cows. The business did not last many years, selling the cheese-making equipment in 1884.

The factory is a simple 2-story frame building on a limestone basement, with a one-story wing to the side. The design is simple and utilitarian, other than short cornice returns.

In addition to making cheese, the building was a social hub, a place where farmers met, and possibly the Good Templars. By 1894 it was used as housing.

References

Further reading
 The Historic Cooksville Cheese Factory by Larry Reed is a more detailed account of Benjamin Hoxie, the successes of his cheese factory, and why it soon ceased operations.

Buildings and structures in Rock County, Wisconsin
Industrial buildings and structures on the National Register of Historic Places in Wisconsin
Industrial buildings completed in 1875
Cheesemakers
Dairy products companies of the United States
National Register of Historic Places in Rock County, Wisconsin
Food and drink companies based in Wisconsin
1875 establishments in Wisconsin